Line 13 of Qingdao Metro is a suburban metro line in Qingdao. The line runs across much of coastal Huangdao District in Qingdao.

Line 13 was opened on 26 December 2018. Initially, the line was not connected to the rest of the Qingdao Metro system. It has since been connected via the southern section of Line 1.

Opening timeline

Stations

References

Qingdao Metro lines
2018 establishments in China
Railway lines opened in 2018